Class 06 may refer to:

 British Rail Class 06, a class of post-war, British diesel-mechanical shunter
 DRB Class 06, a class of inter-war, German, standard steam locomotive for express train services

See also
 Class 6 (disambiguation)